Hüseyin Atakan Üner (born 16 June 1999) is a Turkish professional footballer who plays as a winger for Afjet Afyonspor on loan from Beşiktaş.

Career
A youth product for Denizlispor, Üner moved to Altınordu in 2018, and then to Beşiktaş on 24 August 2020. Üner made his professional debut with Beşiktaş in a 3-1 Süper Lig win over Trabzonspor on 13 September 2020.

On July 21, 2022 Üner moved to First League club Tuzlaspor from Beşiktaş on loan until the end of the 2022-23 season.

References

External links

1999 births
Living people
Sportspeople from Denizli
Turkish footballers
Turkey youth international footballers
Association football wingers
Süper Lig players
TFF First League players
TFF Third League players
Denizlispor footballers
Altınordu F.K. players
Beşiktaş J.K. footballers
Ümraniyespor footballers
Tuzlaspor players
Turkey under-21 international footballers